The 2008 Samsung 500 was the seventh race for the 2008 NASCAR Sprint Cup season and run on Sunday, April 6 at Texas Motor Speedway in Fort Worth, Texas.  The race was broadcast on television by Fox starting at 1:30 PM US EDT, and broadcast via radio and Sirius Satellite Radio on the Performance Racing Network beginning at 1 PM US EDT.

Entry list

Pre race notes
 Chad McCumbee replaced Kyle Petty in the #45 Petty Enterprises Dodge ride this week; however, for the second straight race, the #45 car failed to qualify.
 BAM Racing will skip both this week's race and the following race at Phoenix as their transition to Toyota has been harder than they thought.

Qualifying

Dale Earnhardt Jr. won his first pole as a member of Hendrick Motorsports, with a speed of just under 191 mph.  

However, the major story to come out of this was the spectacular crash of Michael McDowell into Turn One during his second qualifying lap in the #00 Toyota for Michael Waltrip Racing. Going into Turn 1, McDowell said on the radio "Way too tight!" The car proceeded to turn sharply left, then when McDowell tried to correct it, the car sharply steered hardly to the right, plowing head-first into the SAFER barrier at over 180 mph, causing his car to barrel-roll 8 times with fire coming from the engine compartment. McDowell was shown to be moving around in the car when the car landed on its wheels in the middle of Turns 1 and 2, and seconds later was able to get out of the car under his own power, uninjured. Due to the fact that his primary car was destroyed, he was forced into the rear of the field in a backup. The crash would prove the safety of the Car of Tomorrow, which had been criticized for its looks. For most of McDowell's career, this would be his legacy; proving the safety of the Car of Tomorrow until the 2021 season, when in a stunning upset McDowell would pass Brad Keselowski and Joey Logano on the final lap to win the 2021 Daytona 500.

Failed to qualify: Burney Lamar (#08), Dario Franchitti (#40), Chad McCumbee (#45).

Race recap
The race was won by Carl Edwards. Jimmie Johnson, Kyle Busch, Ryan Newman and Denny Hamlin would round out the top five while Jeff Burton, Tony Stewart, Mark Martin, Matt Kenseth and Clint Bowyer would be the remaining finishers in the top ten finishing order.

Results

References

Samsung 500
Samsung 500
21st century in Fort Worth, Texas
NASCAR races at Texas Motor Speedway